River Heights may refer to:

 River Heights, Utah, a city in Cache County, Utah
 River Heights (electoral district), a provincial electoral division in the Canadian province of Manitoba
 River Heights, Winnipeg, a neighborhood of Winnipeg, Manitoba in roughly the same area as the riding above
 River Heights, Saskatoon, an area of Saskatoon, Saskatchewan
 River Heights, Nancy Drew's fictional home town in Midwestern United States.
River Heights (Nancy Drew), a spinoff series from the original Nancy Drew series